"Heartbreaker" is a song by American singer Dionne Warwick. It was written by Barry, Robin and Maurice Gibb of the Bee Gees for her 1982 studio album Heartbreaker, while production was helmed by Barry Gibb, Albhy Galuten and Karl Richardson under their production moniker Gibb-Galuten-Richardson. Barry Gibb's backing vocal is heard on the chorus.

Background
"Heartbreaker" was written by Barry, Robin and Maurice Gibb of the Bee Gees for  singer Dionne Warwick's same-titled album. The song blended the Gibb brothers' two schools of songwriting: it has the clear verse and chorus structure favored by Robin and Maurice, yet also has the longer spun-out verses Barry now preferred, both well balanced, so that it has instant appeal but takes repeated listenings to fully appreciate. The melody is reminiscent of "Living Eyes", but the song has a much stronger forward motion. Maurice said later that he wished they had saved it for themselves. The Bee Gees' demo version, sung by Barry, was not released until 2006 when it appeared on The Heartbreaker Demos (2006), the group's demo album of Warwick's album.

Warwick admitted in The Billboard Book of Number One Adult Contemporary Hits by Wesley Hyatt that she was not fond of "Heartbreaker" (regarding the song's international popularity, she quipped, "I cried all the way to the bank"), but recorded it because she trusted the Bee Gees' judgment that it would be a hit. Maurice Gibb, who co-wrote the song, commented, "I cried my eyes out after we wrote it. I drove home and thought, 'We should be doing this one', and when she did it, it was brilliant. We sang on it, and it still became like a duet between the Bee Gees and Dionne Warwick".

Outcome
The song reached the top ten over a dozen countries and stands as one of Warwick's biggest career hits, selling an estimated 4 million singles worldwide. In the U.S., it peaked at number 10 on the Billboard Hot 100 chart in January 1983. The track was Warwick's eighth number one Adult Contemporary hit and reached number 14 on the Hot Black Singles chart. It was ranked as Billboard magazine's 80th-biggest US hit of 1983. On the UK Singles Chart, the track reached number 2 in November 1982.

Cover versions
The Bee Gees' own version, with Barry Gibb on lead vocals, was recorded in 1994. It was originally planned for an album called Love Songs to be released in 1995, but was eventually released in 2001 on Their Greatest Hits: The Record. "Heartbreaker" was originally recorded as a single released on the Yep Roc label in 2019. Later it was released on a full length (Walkabout) originally released in Australia to commemorate their tour of the continent. Eventually it was released for the rest of the world as well.

Track listings
All tracks produced by Gibb-Galuten-Richardson.

Charts

Weekly charts

Year-end charts

See also
List of number-one singles and albums in Sweden
List of Billboard Adult Contemporary number ones of 1982

References

External links
"The Dionne Warwick Channel" – YouTube site containing over 100 Dionne Warwick tunes with rare photos and information on each tune, including "Heartbreaker"
Gibbs Songs: 1982
 

1982 singles
Dionne Warwick songs
Barry Gibb songs
Bee Gees songs
Demis Roussos songs
Number-one singles in Sweden
Songs written by Barry Gibb
Songs written by Robin Gibb
Songs written by Maurice Gibb
Song recordings produced by Albhy Galuten
1982 songs
Arista Records singles